The 1929 Howard Bulldogs football team was an American football team that represented Howard College (now known as the Samford University) as a member of the Southern Intercollegiate Athletic Association (SIAA) during the 1929 college football season. In their first year under head coach Eddie McLane, the team compiled a 5–4–2 record.

Schedule

References

Howard
Samford Bulldogs football seasons
Howard Bulldogs football